Finn Guttormsen (born 16 July 1968 in Mosjøen, Norway) is a Norwegian Jazz musician (upright bass), known for his dedicated contributions to the Farmers Market and recently to the Silje Nergaard Band, and musicians like Trygve Seim, Øyvind Brække, Per Oddvar Johansen, Håkon Storm-Mathisen, Jarle Vespestad, Hans Mathisen, Arve Henriksen.

Career
Guttormsen is a graduate of the jazz program at Trondheim Musikkonservatorium (1990). He was first recognized as bassist in the Farmers Market, where he has contributed since the start in 1991. He has also been a member of bands like The Source (1995–2005) and Quaternion, and has played within Hemisfair. In recent years he has also contributed within Håkon Storm-Mathisen Quartet and Silje Nergaard Band.

Honors
Spellemannprisen 2008, in the Open class, within Farmers Market
Spellemannprisen 2012, in the Open class, within Farmers Market

Discography

Within The Farmers Market
1995: Speed / Balkan / Boogie
1997: Musikk fra Hybridene (Music from the Hybrids) (Kirkelig Kulturverksted)
2000: Farmers Market (Winter & Winter)
2008: Surfin' USSR (Ipecac Recordings)
2012: Slav to the Rhythm (Division Records)

With Elias Akselsen 
2003: Her kommer dine arme små (Via Music), with Stian Carstensen and Dag Wolf
2005: O, Jesus, du som fyller alt og alle (Via Music). Songs by Aage Samuelsen, with Stian Carstensen and Knut Hem

With Silje Nergaard 
2007: Darkness Out of Blue (Universal), Within The Silje Nergaard Band
2009: A Thousand True Stories (Universal), Within The Silje Nergaard Band
2010: If I Could Wrap Up A Kiss (Sony Music), Within The Silje Nergaard Band

With other projects
1991: Block Songs (Pop Eye), With Epinastic Movements
1993: Rapid (Pop Eye), With Epinastic Movements
1996: Letters (Turn Left), with Håvard Lund
1997: Timbuktu (Turn Left), within Quaternion (including Jarle Vespestad, Hans Mathisen & Arve Henriksen
2002: The Source And Different Cikadas (ECM Records), with Trygve Seim, Øyvind Brække & Per Oddvar Johansen
2002: Jul På Månetoppen (RCA), Music from the TV-series Jul På Månetoppen 
2007: 12 Fluid Ounces (City Connections), With Oslo Fluid as Dr. Rutger
2006: Paint Christmas White (Big Box Records), with Christian Ingebrigtsen
2007: Blue Blue Grass Of Home (Wilma Records), With Hemisfair
2007: The Source:Of Christmas - Live (Grappa), With The Source
2009: Two Rivers One Road (Fairplay Entertainment/Playground, 2009) With Jørn Hoel and Steinar Albrigtsen

Compilation albums
1994:  The Sweet Sunny North (Koch International), With Farmers Market
1996:  The Sweet Sunny North, Vol 2 (Koch International), With Farmers Market
1999:  Balkans Without Borders (Omnium Records), With Farmers Market
2007: Vandringsmannens Beste'' (Via Music), With Elias Akselsen

References

External links
Finn Guttormsen Biography on Farmers Market official website

Norwegian jazz bass guitarists
Norwegian male bass guitarists
Jazz double-bassists
Norwegian jazz upright-bassists
Male double-bassists
Norwegian jazz composers
Norwegian University of Science and Technology alumni
ECM Records artists
Musicians from Vefsn
Living people
1968 births
21st-century double-bassists
Male jazz composers
21st-century Norwegian male musicians
Farmers Market (band) members